China Forbes (born April 29, 1970) is an American singer and songwriter who has been the lead singer of the band Pink Martini since 1995. In 2022 she was the Ella Fitzgerald award winner at the International Montreal Jazz Festival.

Life and career
The daughter of Peggy (née Woodford) and Donald Cameron Forbes, China Forbes was born and raised in Cambridge, Massachusetts. Her father was of French and Scottish descent, and her mother is African-American. She attended Phillips Exeter Academy ('88), then studied visual arts at Harvard University, where she met Thomas Lauderdale, a classically trained pianist. They became friends and met regularly to play music together. At Harvard, she won the  Jonathan Levy Prize for acting.

After graduating in 1992, Forbes worked as an actress for several years, performing Off-Broadway in New York City. She then became a musician, forming a band and recording a solo album. She sang the song "Ordinary Girl" for the television series Clueless and "Que Sera Sera" over the credits for the movie In the Cut. While living in Portland, Oregon, Lauderdale asked her to sing with Pink Martini, a band he had assembled to play at political fundraisers. After three years commuting from New York, she moved to Portland in 1998 to work full-time with the band. Forbes and Lauderdale co-wrote the band's hit "Sympathique (Je ne Veux Pas Travailler)" among many other band originals.

Apart from her work with Pink Martini, she has released solo albums, including Love Handle (November 1995) and 78 (Heinz 2008) which includes her song "Hey Eugene" in its original version.  She is featured on Michael Feinstein's album The Sinatra Project, singing a duet of "How Long Will It Last?". She recorded two songs in French with Georges Moustaki for his album Solitaire.

She is a cousin of former U.S. Secretary of State John Kerry and indie-rock musician Ed Droste of Grizzly Bear. Her sister is  Maya Forbes, a screenwriter and director.

Discography
 1995 Love Handle
 1996 Ordinary Girl
 2008 ' 78

With Pink Martini
 1997 Sympathique
 2004 Hang on Little Tomato
 2007 Hey Eugene!
 2009 Splendor in the Grass
 2010 Joy to the World
 2011 A Retrospective
 2013 Get Happy
 2016 Je Dis Oui!

With others
 2003 Cruising Attitude, Dimitri from Paris
 2008 Solitaire, Georges Moustaki
 2008 The Sinatra Project, Michael Feinstein

References

External links

 
 Pink Martini – band members biographical information

1970 births
Living people
American women jazz singers
American jazz singers
African-American women singer-songwriters
American stage actresses
Harvard College alumni
Musicians from Cambridge, Massachusetts
Phillips Exeter Academy alumni
Pink Martini members
China
Jazz musicians from Massachusetts
21st-century American singers
21st-century American women singers
Singer-songwriters from Massachusetts